Educational Policy is a peer-reviewed academic journal that covers the field of education policy. The editor-in-chief is Ana M. Martinez Aleman (Boston College). The journal was established in 1987 and is published by SAGE Publishing.

Abstracting and indexing
The journal is abstracted and indexed in Scopus, Social Sciences Citation Index, EBSCO, ProQuest, ERIC, and Wilson Education Index/Abstracts. According to the Journal Citation Reports, its 2017 impact factor is 1.586, ranking it 93rd out of 238 journals in the category "Education and Educational Research".

References

External links 

SAGE Publishing academic journals
English-language journals
Education policy journals
Publications established in 1987
7 times per year journals